The Snake River  is in the Yukon Territory near the Northwest Territories border. It is the farthest east river in the Peel watershed, a major tributary of the Mackenzie River.

The Snake is 300 km (186 mi) in length.  The headwaters of the river are in the Werneke Mountains.

The name in Gwich'in is Gyuu Dazhoo Njik.

See also
List of rivers of Yukon

References

Rivers of Yukon